Yangdong District is a district of the city of Yangjiang, Guangdong Province, China.

History
Yangdong was the site of Xin Prefecture (Xinzhou) under the Song.

References

County-level divisions of Guangdong
Yangjiang